Abramtsevo is a rural locality (a selo) in Khotkovo Urban Settlement of Sergiyevo-Posadsky District, Moscow Oblast, Russia. The population was 209 as of 2010. There are 44 streets.

Geography 
Abramtsevo is located 22 km southwest of Sergiyev Posad (the district's administrative centre) by road. Glebovo is the nearest rural locality.

See also
Abramtsevo Colony

References 

Rural localities in Moscow Oblast